Judge Miller may refer to:

Andrew Miller (North Dakota judge) (1870–1960), judge of the United States District Court for the District of North Dakota
Andrew G. Miller (1801–1874), judge of the United States District Court for the District of Wisconsin and of the Eastern District of Wisconsin
Brian S. Miller (born 1967), judge of the United States District Court for the Eastern District of Arkansas
Christine Odell Cook Miller (born 1944), judge of the United States Court of Federal Claims
Eric D. Miller (born 1975), judge of the United States Court of Appeals for the Ninth Circuit
George W. Miller (judge) (1941–2016), judge of the United States Court of Federal Claims
Gray H. Miller (born 1948), judge of the United States District Court for the Southern District of Texas
Jack Miller (politician) (1916–1994), judge of the United States Court of Appeals for the Federal Circuit
James Rogers Miller Jr. (1931–2014), judge of the United States District Court for the District of Maryland
Jeffrey T. Miller (born 1943), judge of the United States District Court for the Southern District of California
Joe Miller (Alaska politician) (born 1967), magistrate judge of the United States District Court for the District of Alaska
John E. Miller (1888–1981), judge of the United States District Court for the Western District of Arkansas
John Lester Miller (1901–1978), judge of the United States District Court for the Western District of Pennsylvania
Philip R. Miller (1918–1989), judge of the United States Court of Federal Claims
Robert Lowell Miller Jr. (born 1950), judge of the United States District Court for the Northern District of Indiana
Shackelford Miller Jr. (1892–1965), judge of the United States Court of Appeals for the Sixth Circuit
Walker David Miller (1939–2013), judge of the United States District Court for the District of Colorado
Wilbur Kingsbury Miller (1892–1976), judge of the United States Court of Appeals for the District of Columbia Circuit
William Ernest Miller (1908–1976), judge of the United States Court of Appeals for the Sixth Circuit

See also
Justice Miller (disambiguation)